The Lancia 12 HP, later known as Lancia Zeta, is a passenger car produced by Lancia between 1912 and 1914. It was intended to be Lancia's smaller offering, positioned below the 4-litre 20/30HP Delta and Epsilon models. The Zeta did not prove a success, and production is estimated at just 34 examples (for comparison, 351 20/30 HP Epsilons were made in 1911–1912); none have survived.

Specifications
The Zeta was powered by a Tipo 59 side valve monobloc inline-four, displacing 2,620 cc, which produced 30 hp at 1,800 rpm.

The separate body was built on a ladder frame; front and rear there were solid axles on semi-elliptic leaf springs. The brakes were drums on the rear wheels, with both lever and pedal actuation. The transmission was a 2-speed gearbox, which coupled to the two different sets of final drives at the rear axle effectively gave the car four speed; the clutch was of the multi-plate dry type.

References

Bibliography

 

Zeta
Cars introduced in 1912
Brass Era vehicles